Cy Howard (September 27, 1915 - April 29, 1993) was an American director, producer and screenwriter.  Howard created My Friend Irma a top-rated, long-running radio situation comedy and media franchise. He won an Primetime Emmy Award in the category Outstanding Writing for a Variety Series for the television program The Smothers Brothers Comedy Hour. Howard died in April 1993 of heart failure at the Cedars-Sinai Medical Center in Los Angeles, California, at the age of 77.

References

External links 

1915 births
1993 deaths
People from Milwaukee
American male screenwriters
American television writers
American male television writers
American television producers
American film producers
American film directors
20th-century American male writers
Primetime Emmy Award winners
University of Wisconsin alumni
University of Minnesota alumni